River Bottom is a census-designated place (CDP) in Muskogee County, Oklahoma, United States. The population was 265 at the 2000 census.

Geography

Demographics

As of the census of 2000, there were 265 people, 100 households, and 82 families residing in the CDP. The population density was 28.7 people per square mile (11.1/km2). There were 113 housing units at an average density of 12.2/sq mi (4.7/km2). The racial makeup of the CDP was 69.43% White, 1.51% African American, 19.25% Native American, 0.75% from other races, and 9.06% from two or more races. Hispanic or Latino of any race were 1.13% of the population.

There were 100 households, out of which 27.0% had children under the age of 18 living with them, 74.0% were married couples living together, 6.0% had a female householder with no husband present, and 18.0% were non-families. 16.0% of all households were made up of individuals, and 6.0% had someone living alone who was 65 years of age or older. The average household size was 2.65 and the average family size was 2.90.

In the CDP, the population was spread out, with 21.9% under the age of 18, 7.2% from 18 to 24, 29.4% from 25 to 44, 31.3% from 45 to 64, and 10.2% who were 65 years of age or older. The median age was 39 years. For every 100 females, there were 136.6 males. For every 100 females age 18 and over, there were 113.4 males.

The median income for a household in the CDP was $30,250, and the median income for a family was $34,250. Males had a median income of $23,125 versus $19,375 for females. The per capita income for the CDP was $13,486. About 6.9% of families and 7.7% of the population were below the poverty line, including 12.3% of those under the age of eighteen and none of those 65 or over.

References

Census-designated places in Muskogee County, Oklahoma
Census-designated places in Oklahoma
Oklahoma populated places on the Arkansas River